Une partie de plaisir (A Piece of Pleasure) is a 1975 French film directed by Claude Chabrol and starring its screenwriter and longtime Chabrol collaborator Paul Gégauff. In the film, Gégauff plays a writer with a troubled marriage that ends in tragedy. (In 1983, Gégauff was stabbed to death in real life by his second wife.) In this film, his wife is played by his real-life first wife Danièle Gégauff (already divorced when this film was made) and his daughter is played by real life daughter Clemence Gégauff.

Plot
Philippe and Esther are happily married and living a middle class life with their young daughter. In order to add excitement and sophistication to the marriage, Philippe suggests they begin sleeping with other people then describing it to each other. But Philippe becomes filled with jealousy and anger towards his wife until tragedy destroys the entire family.

Cast
 Danièle Gégauff as Esther
 Paul Gégauff as Philippe
 Clemence Gégauff as Elise
 Paula Moore as Sylvia Murdoch
 Cécile Vassort as Annie
 Giancarlo Sisti as Habib
 Mario Santini as Rosco
 Michel Valette as Katkof
 Pierre Santini as Michel

Reception
John Simon described Une Partie de plasir's story as 'partly trivial, and partly unbelievable'. Simon went described the films characters as 'too bad, too good, or too stupid to be true, and neither plot nor dialogue comes to the rescue'.

Notes

External links

Adultery in films
French drama films
Films directed by Claude Chabrol
Films about domestic violence
1975 films
Films with screenplays by Paul Gégauff
1970s French films